Association Michlifen Ifrane Basket-ball, also known as AMI Basket, is a Moroccan basketball club based in Ifrane. The team competes in the Division Excellence, the national top level league. The club was established in 2014 and has a youth academy with over 140 children aged 4 to 14. In 2016, the men's team won the Moroccan Third Division championship.

Honours
Moroccan 3rd Division
Champions (1): 2015–16

References

Basketball teams in Morocco
Basketball teams established in 2014